Hugh Greer (1902 – January 14, 1963) was the Connecticut Huskies men's basketball coach from 1946 to 1963.

Biography

Early life and education
Born in Suffield, Connecticut, Hugh Greer went to school at Connecticut Agricultural College (CAC, now University of Connecticut). As a basketball player at CAC, Greer helped lead his school to a New England Conference championship in 1926.

Coaching career
Greer coached basketball at Connecticut from 1947 to 1963.  As coach of the Huskies he led UConn to 7 NCAA Tournaments and 1 NIT berth. He would end his career with a record of 286–112 for a .719 win percentage.  He was the winningest coach in Connecticut history until Jim Calhoun passed him in 1998.  As head coach, he won 12 Yankee Conference Championships overall and 10 consecutively from the 1950–51 season to the 1959–60 season.

In 1954, he famously led UConn to a 78–77 victory against undefeated Holy Cross breaking the Crusaders' 47-game home winning streak. Eventually, Holy Cross won the NIT title.  In 1956, Greer led UConn to the Sweet 16, where they lost in a close game to Temple.  He led UConn until he died on January 14, 1963, of a massive heart attack.  Assistant George Wigton finished out the season and led them to the NCAA Tournament.  UConn credits the first 10 games of the season to Greer and the rest of the season (including the NCAA Tournament) to Wigton.

Head coaching record

Awards
1957: University of Connecticut Distinguished Alumni Award

References

1902 births
1963 deaths
American men's basketball coaches
American men's basketball players
Basketball coaches from Connecticut
Basketball players from Connecticut
People from Suffield, Connecticut
UConn Huskies athletic directors
UConn Huskies men's basketball coaches
UConn Huskies men's basketball players